Yasenevo is a station on the Kaluzhsko-Rizhskaya Line of the Moscow Metro. It was designed by N. Shumakov, G. Mun, and N. Shurygina and opened on 17 January 1990. Yasenevo has round, greenish marble columns and walls faced with yellowish metallic tile and pink marble. The recessed oblong spaces between ceiling beams house chandeliers of a simple geometric design.

The entrances to the station are located under an intersection between Novoyasenevsky avenue, Tarusskaya street and Yasnogorskaya street.

Gallery 

Moscow Metro stations
Railway stations in Russia opened in 1990
Kaluzhsko-Rizhskaya Line
Railway stations located underground in Russia